The women's tournament of the 2014 European Curling Championships was held from November 22 to 29 at the Palladium de Champéry in Champéry, Switzerland. The winners of the Group C tournament in Zoetermeer, the Netherlands moved on to the Group B tournament. The top eight women's teams at the 2013 European Curling Championships will represent their respective nations at the 2015 World Women's Curling Championship in Sapporo, Japan.

Group A

Teams
The teams are listed as follows:

Round-robin standings
Final round-robin standings

Round-robin results
All draw times are listed in Central European Time (UTC+1).

Draw 1
Saturday, November 22, 15:00

Draw 2
Sunday, November 23, 8:00

Draw 3
Sunday, November 23, 16:00

Draw 4
Monday, November 24, 9:00

Draw 5
Monday, November 24, 19:00

Draw 6
Tuesday, November 25, 12:00

Draw 7
Tuesday, November 25, 20:00

Draw 8
Wednesday, November 26, 14:00

Draw 9
Thursday, November 27, 9:00

World Challenge Games
The World Challenge Games are held between the eighth-ranked team in the Group A round robin and the winner of the Group B tournament to determine which of these two teams will play at the World Championships.

Challenge 1
Friday, November 28, 19:30

Challenge 2
Saturday, November 29, 9:00

Challenge 3
Saturday, November 29, 14:00

Playoffs

1 vs. 2
Thursday, November 27, 19:00

3 vs. 4
Thursday, November 27, 19:00

Semifinal
Friday, November 28, 13:00

Bronze-medal game
Friday, November 28, 19:30

Gold-medal game
Saturday, November 29, 10:00

Player percentages
Round Robin only

Group B

Teams
The teams are listed as follows:

Round-robin standings
Final round-robin standings

Round-robin results
All draw times are listed in Central European Time (UTC+1).

Draw 1
Saturday, November 22, 12:00

Draw 2
Saturday, November 22, 20:00

Draw 3
Sunday, November 23, 14:00

Draw 4
Monday, November 24, 8:00

Draw 5
Monday, November 24, 16:00

Draw 6
Tuesday, November 25, 9:00

Draw 7
Tuesday, November 25, 19:00

Draw 8
Wednesday, November 26, 12:00

Draw 9
Wednesday, November 26, 20:00

Tiebreaker
Thursday, November 27, 8:30

Playoffs

1 vs. 2
Thursday, November 27, 14:00

3 vs. 4
Thursday, November 27, 14:00

Semifinal
Thursday, November 27, 20:00

Bronze-medal game
Friday, November 28, 10:00

Gold-medal game
Friday, November 28, 10:00

Group C

Teams

Round-robin standings
Final round-robin standings

Round-robin results
All draw times are listed in Central European Time (UTC+1).

Draw 2
Sunday, October 5, 12:00

Draw 3
Sunday, October 5, 16:00

Draw 6
Monday, October 6, 12:00

Draw 7
Monday, October 6, 16:00

Draw 8
Monday, October 6, 20:00

Draw 10
Tuesday, October 7, 12:00

Draw 11
Tuesday, October 7, 16:00

Draw 13
Wednesday, October 8, 8:00

Draw 14
Wednesday, October 8, 12:00

Draw 16
Wednesday, October 8, 20:00

Draw 18
Thursday, October 9, 12:00

Draw 19
Thursday, October 9, 16:00

Draw 21
Friday, October 10, 8:00

Playoffs

1 vs. 2
Friday, October 10, 20:00

 advances to Group B competitions.
 advances to Second Place Game.

3 vs. 4
Saturday, October 11, 9:00

 advances to Second Place Game.

Second Place Game
Saturday, October 11, 13:30

 advances to Group B competitions.

References
General
Specific

External links

2014 in women's curling
European Curling Championships
European Curling Championships
Women's curling competitions in Switzerland
November 2014 sports events in Europe